Top Country Albums is a chart that ranks the top-performing country music albums in the United States, published by Billboard.  In 1987, 12 different albums topped the chart, based on sales reports submitted by a representative sample of stores nationwide.

The number one position was occupied for nearly half the year by Always & Forever by Randy Travis.  First topping the chart in the issue of Billboard dated June 20, by the end of the year the album would spend 25 weeks at number one in three separate runs.  It would add a further 18 weeks to its tally the following year for a final total of 43 weeks atop the listing, beating by a considerable amount the previous record of 28 weeks set by Alabama with both Feels So Right and Mountain Music between 1981 and 1983.  Travis was one of the main artists identified with the neotraditional country trend, which moved away from the pop music-influenced style which dominated the country charts in the earlier part of the decade in favour of a sound closer to the genre's roots.  Having first topped the chart the previous year with his first major-label album Storms of Life, Travis would continue to experience huge success for the remainder of the decade before his chart performance began to decline in the 1990s.

Three acts achieved more than one number one in 1987.  In the issue of Billboard dated January 3, the band Alabama was at number one with the album The Touch, its eighth week in the top spot.  Later in the year, the band spent a single week in the top spot with Just Us, the group's eighth chart-topper of the number ones.  George Strait spent six non-consecutive weeks at number one in the spring with Ocean Front Property and returned to the top of the chart for a single week in November with the compilation album Greatest Hits Volume Two.  Hank Williams Jr spent one week atop the chart in April with Hank Live and a second week at number one in August with Born to Boogie, bringing his run of consecutive chart-toppers since 1984 to six.  In April, the band Restless Heart achieved its only number one with Wheels, which spent one week at number one.  The band experienced a period of great chart success for the remainder of the decade, but its fortunes declined after lead vocalist Larry Stewart left in 1990 and it disbanded in 1994.

Chart history

References

1987
1987 record charts